Jean-Baptiste Nicolas Robert Schuman (29 June 18864 September 1963) was a Luxembourg-born French statesman. Schuman was a Christian democrat (Popular Republican Movement) political thinker and activist. Twice Prime Minister of France, a reformist Minister of Finance and a Foreign Minister, he was instrumental in building postwar European and trans-Atlantic institutions and was one of the founders of the European Union, the Council of Europe and NATO. The 1964–1965 academic year at the College of Europe was named in his honour. In 2021, Schuman was declared venerable by Pope Francis in recognition of his acting on Christian principles.

Early life

Schuman was born in June 1886 in Clausen, Luxembourg, having his father's German citizenship. His father, Jean-Pierre Schuman (d. 1900), who was a native of Lorraine and was born a French citizen had become a German citizen when Lorraine was annexed by Germany in 1871, and he left to settle in Luxembourg, not far from his native village of Evrange.

His mother, Eugénie Suzanne Duren (d. 1911), was a Luxembourger and even though Robert Schuman would later become involved in French politics, he grew up and attended school in Luxembourg City, speaking Luxembourgish as his mother tongue.

Schuman's secondary schooling from 1896 to 1903 was at Athénée de Luxembourg, followed in 1904 by the Lycée impérial in Metz. From 1904 to 1910, he studied law, economics, political philosophy, theology and statistics at the Universities of Berlin, Munich, Bonn and Strasbourg, and received a law degree with the highest distinction from Strasbourg University.

In 1912, Schuman set up practice as a lawyer in Metz. When the war broke out in 1914, he was called up for the auxiliary troops by the German army in Metz but was excused from military service on health grounds. From 1915 to 1918, he served in the administration of the Boulay district.

Interwar period

After the First World War, Alsace-Lorraine was returned to France, and Schuman became a French citizen in 1919.

Schuman became active in French politics. In 1919, he was first elected as a member of the Chamber of Deputies on a regional list and later served as the deputy for Thionville (Moselle) until 1958, with an interval during the war. He made a major contribution to the drafting and the parliamentary passage of the reintroduction of the French Civil and Commercial Codes by the French parliament, when the Alsace-Lorraine region, then under German rule and thus German law, returned to France. The harmonisation of the regional law with the French law was called "Lex Schuman". Schuman also investigated and patiently uncovered postwar corruption in the Lorraine steel industries and in the Alsace and the Lorraine railways, which were bought for a derisory price by the powerful and influential de Wendel family in what he called in the Parliament "a pillage".

World War II
In 1940, because of his expertise on Germany, Schuman was called to become a member of Paul Reynaud's wartime government to be in charge of the refugees. He kept that position during the first Pétain government. On 10 July, he voted to give full power to Marshal Philippe Pétain, who supported the armistice with Germany, but refused to continue to be in the government. On 14 September, he was arrested for acts of resistance and protest against Nazi methods. He was interrogated by the Gestapo but the intervention of a German lawyer stopped him from being sent to Dachau concentration camp.

French minister
After the war, Schuman rose to great prominence. He initially had difficulties because of his 1940 vote for Petain and for being one of his ministers. In September 1944, General Jean de Lattre de Tassigny, the commander of the French First Army, sought him out to become a political advisor in the affairs of Alsace-Lorraine, the minister of war, demanded shortly later that "this product of Vichy be immediately kicked out". Schuman had been a former minister of Pétain and a parliamentarian who had voted to grant him full powers and so, under the ordinance of 26 August 1944, he was considered ineligible for public office, stricken with indignité nationale. On 24 July 1945, Schuman wrote to Charles de Gaulle to ask him to intervene. De Gaulle answered favourably, and on 15 September, Schuman regained his full civic rights, becoming able to again play an active role in French politics.

Schuman was Minister of Finance in 1946 and Prime Minister from 1947 to 1948. He assured parliamentary stability during a period of revolutionary strikes and attempted insurrection. In the last days of his first administration, his government proposed plans that later resulted in the Council of Europe and the European Community single market. Becoming Foreign Minister in 1948, he retained the post in different governments until early 1953. When Schuman's first government had proposed the creation of a European Assembly, it made the issue a governmental matter for Europe, not merely an academic discussion or the subject of private conferences, like The Hague Congress of the European Movements earlier in 1948. (Schuman's was one of the few governments to send active ministers.) The proposal saw life as the Council of Europe and was created within the tight schedule that Schuman had set. At the signing of its Statutes at St James's Palace, London, on 5 May 1949, the founding states agreed to defining the borders of Europe based on the principles of human rights and fundamental freedoms that Schuman enunciated there. He also announced a coming supranational union for Europe that saw light as the European Coal and Steel Community and other such Communities within a union framework of common law and democracy:

As Foreign Minister, he announced in September 1948 and the next year, before the United Nations General Assembly, France's aim to create a democratic organisation for Europe, which a post-Nazi and democratic Germany could join. In 1949 and 1950, he made a series of speeches in Europe and North America about creating a supranational European Community. This supranational structure, he said, would create lasting peace between Member States.

On 9 May 1950, the principles of supranational democracy were announced in what has become known as the Schuman Declaration. The text was jointly prepared by Paul Reuter, the legal adviser at the Foreign Ministry and his aide  and Jean Monnet and two of his team members, Pierre Uri and Étienne Hirsch. The French government agreed to the Schuman Declaration, which invited the Germans and all other European countries to manage their coal and steel industries jointly and democratically in Europe's first supranational Community, with its five fundamental institutions. On 18 April 1951, six founder members signed the Treaty of Paris, which formed the basis of the European Coal and Steel Community. They declared that date and the corresponding democratic, supranational principles to be the 'real foundation of Europe'. Three communities have been created so far. The Treaties of Rome (1957) created the Economic Community and the nuclear non-proliferation Community, Euratom. Together with intergovernmental machinery of later treaties, they eventually evolved into the European Union. The Schuman Declaration was made on 9 May 1950 and since then, 9 May is designated to be Europe Day.

As Prime Minister and Foreign Minister Schuman was instrumental in the creation of the North Atlantic Treaty Organization (NATO). Schuman also signed the North Atlantic Treaty for France. The defensive principles of NATO's Article 5 were also repeated in the European Defence Community Treaty, which failed since the French National Assembly declined to vote its ratification. Schuman also supported an Atlantic Community.

European politics

Schuman later served as Minister of Justice before becoming the first President of the European Parliamentary Assembly (the successor to the Common Assembly), which bestowed on him by acclamation the title 'Father of Europe'. He is considered one of the founding fathers of the European Union. He presided over the European Movement from 1955 to 1961. In 1958, he received the Karlspreis, an Award by the German city of Aachen to people who contributed to the European idea and European peace, commemorating Charlemagne, the ruler of what is now both France and Germany, who lived in and is buried at Aachen. Schuman was also made a knight of the Order of Pius IX.

Schuman was intensely religious and a Bible scholar. He commended the writings of Pope Pius XII, who condemned both fascism and communism. He was an expert in medieval philosophy, especially the writings of Thomas Aquinas, and he thought highly of the philosopher Jacques Maritain, a contemporary.

Cause of beatification and canonization 
On 9 June 1990, the Bishop of Metz, Pierre Raffin, authorized the opening of the beatification process. Schuman was proclaimed a Servant of God in May 2004, with the conclusion of the diocesan process. The documents were sent to the Vatican, where the Congregation for the Causes of Saints is studying the dossier.

On June 19, 2021, in an audience granted to Cardinal Marcello Semeraro, Pope Francis authorized the Congregation for the Causes of Saints to promulgate the decree concerning the heroic virtues of Robert Schuman, who can thus be defined as Venerable. The promulgation of the decree is a first step towards sanctification by the Roman Catholic Church.

Memorials 

The Schuman District of Brussels (including a metro/railway station and a tunnel, as well as a square) is named in his honour. Around the square ("Schuman roundabout") can be found various European institutions, including the Berlaymont building which is the headquarters of the European Commission and has a monument to Schuman outside, as well as key European Parliament buildings. In the nearby Cinquantenaire Park, there is a bust of Schuman as a memorial to him. The European Parliament awards the Robert Schuman Scholarship for university graduates to complete a traineeship within the European Parliament and gain experience within the different committees, legislative processes and framework of the European Union.

A Social Science University named after him lies in Strasbourg (France) along with the Avenue du President Robert Schuman in that city's European Quarter. In Luxembourg there is a Rond Point Schuman, Boulevard Robert Schuman, a school called Lycée Robert Schuman and a Robert Schuman Building, of the European Parliament.  In Esch-sur-Alzette, Luxembourg, there is a Rue Robert Schuman. The house where he was born was restored by the European Parliament and can be visited, as can his home in Scy-Chazelles just outside Metz.

In 1952 Schuman was awarded with an honorary doctorate in the Netherlands, at the Katholieke Economische Hogeschool Tilburg, at present Tilburg University.

In Aix-en-Provence, a town in Bouches-du-Rhone, France, there is an Avenue Robert Schumann, which houses the three university buildings of the town and in Ireland there is a building in the University of Limerick named the "Robert Schuman" building.

The European University Institute in Florence, Italy, is home to the Robert Schuman Centre for Advanced Studies (RSCAS), focusing on "inter-disciplinary, comparative, and policy research on the major issues on the European integration process".

The Robert Schuman Institute in Budapest, Hungary, a European level training institution of the European People's Party family is dedicated to promoting the idea of a united Europe, supporting and the process of democratic transformation in Central, Eastern and South Eastern Europe and the development of Christian Democratic and centre right political parties also bears the name of Robert Schuman.

In 1965, the Robert Schuman Mittelschule in the St. Mang suburb of the city of Kempten in southern Bavaria was named after him.

Governments

First ministry (24 November 1947 – 26 July 1948)
 Robert Schuman – President of the Council
 Georges Bidault – Minister of Foreign Affairs
 Pierre-Henri Teitgen – Minister of National Defense
 Jules Moch – Minister of the Interior
 René Mayer – Minister of Finance and Economic Affairs
 Robert Lacoste – Minister of Commerce and Industry
 Daniel Mayer – Minister of Labour and Social Security
 André Marie – Minister of Justice
 Marcel Edmond Naegelen – Minister of National Education
 François Mitterrand – Minister of Veterans and War Victims
 Pierre Pflimlin – Minister of Agriculture
 Paul Coste-Floret – Minister of Overseas France
 Christian Pineau – Minister of Public Works and Transport
 Germaine Poinso-Chapuis – Minister of Public Health and Population
 René Coty – Minister of Reconstruction and Town Planning

Changes:
 12 February 1948 – Édouard Depreux succeeds Naegelen as Minister of National Education.

Second ministry (5–11 September 1948)
 Robert Schuman – President of the Council and Minister of Foreign Affairs
 René Mayer – Minister of National Defense
 André Marie – Vice President of the Council
 Jules Moch – Minister of the Interior
 Christian Pineau – Minister of Finance and Economic Affairs
 Robert Lacoste – Minister of Commerce and Industry
 Daniel Mayer – Minister of Labour and Social Security
 Robert Lecourt – Minister of Justice
 Tony Revillon – Minister of National Education
 Jules Catoire – Minister of Veterans and War Victims
 Pierre Pflimlin – Minister of Agriculture
 Paul Coste-Floret – Minister of Overseas France
 Henri Queuille – Minister of Public Works, Transport, and Tourism
 Pierre Schneiter – Minister of Public Health and Population
 René Coty – Minister of Reconstruction and Town Planning

See also

References

Further reading 
 Avery, Graham. "Robert Schuman on Hungary and Europe." Hungarian Quarterly 198 (2010): 3–16.
 Domingo, Rafael. "Robert Schuman and the process of European integration." in Christianity and Global Law (2020) pp 178–194.
 Fimister, Alan. Robert Schuman: Neo-Scholastic Humanism and the Reunification of Europe (2008) 
 Hitchcock, William I. "France, the Western Alliance, and the origins of the Schuman Plan, 1948–1950." Diplomatic History 21.4 (1997): 603–630.
 Kaiser, Wolfram.  "From state to society? The historiography of European integration." in Michelle Cini and Angela K. Bourne, eds. Palgrave Advances in European Union Studies (Palgrave Macmillan UK, 2006). pp. 190–208.
 Langley, McKendree R. "Robert Schuman and the Politics of Reconciliation." Pro Rege 10.4 (1982): 8–16. online
 Schuman, Robert. "France and Europe." Foreign Affairs, Vol. 31, No. 3, April 1953, pp. 349–360. . .

External links 

 Schuman Project, biographical information plus analysis of Schuman's work initiating a supranational European Community, why it is a major political innovation, and its comparison with classical federalism. Site includes some of Schuman's key speeches announcing the innovation in 1949–50.
 Fondation Robert Schuman
 The Katholische Akademie Trier is vested in the Robert Schuman-Haus 
 [http://www.robert-schuman.eu/declaration_9mai.php Schuman Declaration ](9 May 1950) 
 Video of the Schuman Declaration of the creation of the ECSC – European Navigator
 1949 letter from the UK Foreign minister Ernest Bevin to Robert Schuman, urging a reconsideration of the industrial dismantling policy in Germany.
 
 
 
 
 Robert Schuman archives at the "Fondation Jean Monnet"

1886 births
1963 deaths
People from Luxembourg City
Luxembourgian emigrants to France
French people of German descent
French Roman Catholics
Popular Democratic Party (France) politicians
Popular Republican Movement politicians
Prime Ministers of France
French Foreign Ministers
French Ministers of Justice
French Ministers of Finance
Members of the 12th Chamber of Deputies of the French Third Republic
Members of the 13th Chamber of Deputies of the French Third Republic
Members of the 14th Chamber of Deputies of the French Third Republic
Members of the 15th Chamber of Deputies of the French Third Republic
Members of the 16th Chamber of Deputies of the French Third Republic
Members of the Constituent Assembly of France (1945)
Members of the Constituent Assembly of France (1946)
Deputies of the 1st National Assembly of the French Fourth Republic
Deputies of the 2nd National Assembly of the French Fourth Republic
Deputies of the 3rd National Assembly of the French Fourth Republic
Deputies of the 1st National Assembly of the French Fifth Republic
20th-century French diplomats
Presidents of the European Parliament
Popular Republican Movement MEPs
MEPs for France 1958–1979
History of the European Union
Eurofederalism
Alsatian-German people
European integration pioneers
19th-century Luxembourgian people
Alumni of the Athénée de Luxembourg
University of Bonn alumni
Academic staff of the University of Strasbourg
Grand Crosses 1st class of the Order of Merit of the Federal Republic of Germany
French people of Luxembourgian descent
Venerated Catholics by Pope Francis